The Phoenix Throne is the third full-length release from Chicago-based metalcore band Dead to Fall. The album contains some of the longest songs the band has recorded to date.

Track listing

Credits
Performers
Chad M. Fjerstad - Bass
Jonathan D. Hunt - Vocals
Timothy Java - Drums
Logan Kelly - Guitars
Aaron Nelson - Guitars
Additional Credits
Art Direction, Artwork and Design - Paul A. Romano
Produced by Eric Rachel and Dead to Fall.

Reception
 HCS.net  link
 Punknews.org  link |

Trivia

Some digital media players, such as iTunes, recognize the track Smoke & Mirrors'' as "Pawns."
Michael Romeo of Symphony X provides the orchestra/choir present in "Death & Rebirth."

References 

Dead to Fall albums
2006 albums
Victory Records albums